Erek Lin (林暉閔, Lin Hui Min, born September 10, 1997) is a Taiwanese actor. Making his debut as a child actor in Starry Starry Night (2012), Lin has since gone on to star in various dramas and movies.

Life and career

1997-2011: Early life and Starry Starry Night (2012) 
Lin was born in Taipei in 1997. He attended Taipei Jing-Xing Junior High School (景興國中) and New Taipei Municipal AnKang High School (新北市立安康高级中學).

Primarily an athlete, he was involved in Taekwondo throughout his early life. In the 6th grade, Lin was Taekwondo National Champion. Interested in track and basketball, his classmates initially thought that he would grow up to have a career in sports.

Coincidentally, after a street casting and after being picked among at least a thousand other individuals contesting the part, Lin was selected for the main role of Zhou Yu-Jie in Starry Starry Night (2012). Director Tom Lin Shu-yu had initially planned to create a "small art-house movie" based on the illustrated novel of the same name by illustrator and writer Jimmy Liao. Subsequently, however, after the Chinese film studio Huayi Brothers picked up the film, the film became a China-Taiwan co-production and the film's budget was increased to a total of US$7 million

Upon its release, Starry Starry Night was well-received and despite no formal experience in acting, Lin's performance in Starry Starry Night received high praise. His performance earned him a Best New Actor award at the 14th Taipei Film Awards, a nomination for Best Newcomer at the 6th Asian Film Awards, and a nomination for Best New Performer at the 49th Golden Horse Film Awards

2012-2019: University 
After Starry Starry Night, Lin only took on acting jobs in his free time and during the school holidays, making it clear that his priority would be on schooling. In this period, he took on small roles (a bit part in Mayday Nowhere 3D (2012), a dubbed role in drama 泡沫之夏 (2016)) and roles in minor productions (看不見的光影 (2012), 我的爸爸 (2012), 今天我代課 (2015)).

In 2016, Lin gained admission to Taipei National University of the Arts' (國立臺北藝術大學) Department of Film Making.

2020-present: Lead roles and Return to acting 
Starting 2018, Lin began to take on more acting roles. PTS Movie The Defenders (2018) marked his return to acting.

In July 2019, Lin held a role as a main character in PTS Movie, Fragments of Summer (2019). In the movie, he plays Duoduo, a child trafficking victim rendered mute by having his tongue cut out by traffickers. Later in August that year, Lin was announced as one of the main cast members in Season 1 of 76 Horror Bookstore (2020).

Lin also starred in the romantic film Your Name Engraved Herein (2020), the first LGBT film to exceed NT$100 million at the Taiwanese box office. There was also an Alternate Reality Game (ARG) spin-off based on Lin's character in the movie.

In December 2020, Lin starred alongside Chris Wang Yu-Sheng and Allison Lin in new HBO Asia drama, The Adventure of the Ring (2020). The drama is available for worldwide streaming on HBO Go.

Lin stars alongside veteran actors Chang Chen and Janine Chang in The Soul (2021). He will also be starring in the Eastern Broadcasting Company's Drama The Summer Temple Fair (2021), slated to be released in the summer of 2021.

Filmography

Movies

Television Movies

Mini Series

Television Series

Short Films/Independent Films

Awards and nominations

References 

21st-century Taiwanese actors
1997 births
Living people